Midway High School or Henrietta Midway is a public high school located on SH 148 south near the community of Joy, Texas, United States and classified as a 1A school by the UIL. It is part of the Midway Independent School District (Clay County, Texas) located in south central Clay County. All grades (K-12) are housed in one building. In 2015, the school was rated "Met Standard" by the Texas Education Agency.

Athletics
The Midway Falcons compete in the following sports 

Basketball
Cross country
Golf
Tennis
Track and field

State titles
Boys Basketball 
1959(B)
Girls Basketball 
1961(B)
Track
2021(1A)

Academics
UIL Academic Meet Champions 
1998(1A)

References

External links
Midway ISD

Schools in Clay County, Texas
Public high schools in Texas
Public middle schools in Texas
Public elementary schools in Texas